The Chocolate Mountain Aerial Gunnery Range (CMAGR) is a bombing range operated by the US Marine Corps located in southern California. United States.

Range description 

It straddles the northern portion of the Chocolate Mountains to the east of the Salton Sea in Imperial and Riverside Counties, California, with restricted airspace in both California and Arizona. It is under the jurisdiction of the United States Navy and United States Marine Corps, and is closed to the public.

Range operations 
The United States Department of Defense aviation combat crews have trained at the CMAGR and within its airspace since World War II.  The range is managed by Marine Corps Air Station Yuma.  The CMAGR range area was permanently transferred to the Department of the Navy in 2014 to be used as a military range.  The CMAGR provides opportunities for military training by use of its varied terrain and special use airspace.  The CMAGR is the centerpiece of the Bob Stump Training Range Complex and can support multiple training operations concurrently.  The CMAGR's live-fire aviation training ranges provide training for air combat maneuvering and tactics; air-to-air gunnery; airborne laser system operations; close air support; and air-to-ground bombing, strafing, and rocketry.  The CMAGR also supports ground training to include air defense, air control, communications, demolition operations, as well as the support of small arms and artillery.  The Naval Special Warfare Command also use a portion of the CMAGR for desert warfare training.

The Bradshaw Trail, an old stage road and now a four wheel drive vehicle road, traverses the north boundary of the Gunnery Range between the Chocolate Mountains and the Orocopia Mountains and Chuckwalla Mountains to the north.

The Navy and Marine Corps jointly prepared and published a "Geologic Map and Database of the Chocolate Mountain Aerial Gunnery Range" in 2018.

Gallery

References

External links

 Profile on GlobalSecurity.org
 Final Legislative Environmental Impact Statement for the Renewal of the Chocolate Mountain Aerial Gunnery Range Land Withdrawal Naval Facilities Engineering Command Southwest
 

Installations of the United States Navy in California
Geography of Imperial County, California
Military in Riverside County, California